M. Rajesh is an Indian film director and screenwriter, working primarily in the Tamil film industry. Known for making comedy films, he made his directorial debut with Siva Manasula Sakthi in 2009 and followed it up with Boss Engira Bhaskaran (2010) and Oru Kal Oru Kannadi (2012), all three of which emerged very successful at the box office. After this his subsequent films became box-office bombs and he was described by Sify as having lost his "Midas touch". Rajesh has also been heavily criticised for his films glorifying stalking, drinking and degrading women.

Early life 
M. Rajesh was born in Nagercoil. After studying engineering at National Engineering College in Kovilpatti, he worked as an information technology professional in Mumbai for six months before deciding to pursue a career in film.

Career 
Rajesh worked with the production unit Cosmic Blues, and as an assistant on many short films and advertisement films for one-and-a-half years before shifting to Chennai. He began his feature film career as an assistant director under Ameer in Mounam Pesiyadhe (2002), and later assisted S. A. Chandrasekhar on a few films including Sukran (2005) and Nenjirukkum Varai (2006). After deciding to turn director, Rajesh opted against imitating Ameer or Chandrasekhar's directing styles, but wanted his own style that would appeal to youngsters, and wrote the script of Siva Manasula Sakthi (2009). The film became a commercial success, as did his next two directorial ventures, Boss Engira Bhaskaran (2010) and Oru Kal Oru Kannadi (2012). All three films were described by Sify as having reinvented "the trend of light-hearted comedy entertainers without big storylines".

Rajesh later wrote the dialogues for Varuthapadatha Valibar Sangam (2013), also a success. However, his subsequent directorial ventures All in All Azhagu Raja (2013), Vasuvum Saravananum Onna Padichavanga (2015), Kadavul Irukaan Kumaru (2016) and Mr. Local (2019) became box-office bombs. By the time of Vasuvum Saravananum Onna Padichavangas release, he was described by Sify as having lost his "Midas touch", and that he "should work on something out of the box to taste the much needed success". His next venture, Vanakkam Da Mappilei, premiered on Sun NXT in 2021. In 2022, Rajesh directed "Mirrage", an episode of the anthology thriller series Victim, deviating from his usual comedy films. He also began work on a film tentatively titled JR 30 (as it is the 30th film to star Jayam Ravi).

Personal life 
Rajesh is married to Shakthi, who he met while working as an assistant under Chandrashekhar. Rajesh's father died on 2 October 2010.

Filmography

References

External links 
 

21st-century Indian film directors
21st-century Indian screenwriters
Film directors from Tamil Nadu
Living people
People from Nagercoil
Screenwriters from Tamil Nadu
Tamil film directors
Tamil screenwriters
Year of birth missing (living people)